The Australian Cannonball Cup, was a car race held in 1984 on public roads between Melbourne and Perth, Australia.

Although the event was originally promoted as timed race with very few rules similar to the US Cannonball Run!, after significant negative publicity the organisers insisted the event was a navigation and endurance rally and instituted a disqualification rule if drivers were caught by police for a driving offence.

The entry fee was $550 per team, and first prize was $10,000.

The race started on Friday 2 November 1984 at a private farm in Diggers Rest on the outskirts of Melbourne.

76 teams had entered but a significant number pulled out prior to the start, leaving 33 teams to contest the race.

Teams could choose any route but had to pass through two checkpoints. The first checkpoint was at Berri, South Australia and the second at Albany, Western Australia.

The race was closely followed by police in all three states that it passed through. Many drivers were booked or arrested. Vehicles were checked for roadworthiness, some on more than one occasion, and at least one vehicle was ordered off the road in Western Australia.

On Sunday 4 November the first team arrived at the finish in Fremantle, Western Australia, in 32 hours and 22 minutes.

Some weeks after the race the organisers disqualified the winning car due to the drivers having been caught by police for a driving offence. The second placed team was then awarded the win. No other disqualifications were announced, despite a significant number of other teams having been caught by police.

The race organiser suffered financial problems and no prize money was paid out.

A second event was planned for 1985 but never ran.

Results

References

 Australian Cannonball Official Time Sheet

Further reading
 Australian Cannonball Cup media reports

External links
 Unofficial 1984 Australian Cannonball Cup website

1984 in Australian motorsport